Abudi may refer to:
 Abudi, Shadegan